VR1 may refer to:

 Rishi Rich, British-Indian music producer
 TRPV1, a vanilloid receptor
 VR1 Entertainment, a former ISP and video game developer
 Training Reactor VR-1 pool-type nuclear reactor
 VR Class Vr1, a Finnish locomotive
 VR1, Madeira, the main freeway on the Portuguese island Madeira
 VR-1, a virtual reality system made by Sega.